In Iceland, Beer Day is celebrated every year on March 1, honoring the elimination of the 74-year prohibition of beer.  Prohibition lasted from January 1, 1915 to March 1, 1989.

Origin

In a 1908 referendum, Icelanders voted in favor of a ban on all alcoholic drinks, going into effect Jan. 1, 1915. In 1921, the ban was partially lifted after Spain refused to buy Iceland's main export, fish, unless Iceland bought Spanish wines; then lifted further after a national referendum in 1935 came out in favor of legalizing spirits. Strong beer (with an alcohol content of 2.25% or more), however, was not included in the 1935 vote in order to please the temperance lobby—which argued that because beer is cheaper than spirits, it would lead to more depravity.

As international travel brought Icelanders back in touch with beer, bills to legalize it were regularly moved in parliament, but inevitably were shot down on technical grounds. Prohibition lost more support in 1985, when the Minister of Justice (himself a teetotaler) prohibited pubs from adding legal spirits to legal non-alcoholic beer (called "pilsner" by Icelanders) to make a potent imitation of strong beer. Soon after, beer approached legalization in parliament—a full turnout of the upper house of Iceland's Parliament voted 13 to 8 to permit the sales, ending prohibition in the country.

Celebration

The first Beer Day, Ölstofan bar owner Kormákur Geirharðsson recalls:

Following the end of prohibition, Icelanders have celebrated every Beer Day by imbibing the drink in various bars, restaurants, and clubs. Those located in Reykjavík, the capital and largest city in Iceland, are especially wild on Beer Day.; A  (pub crawl) is a popular way of getting to know the various bars and beers in this city, many being open until 4:00 a.m. the next day. The legalization of beer remains a cultural milestone in Iceland, and a major seismic shift in the nation’s alcoholic beverage preference. Beer has today become the most popular alcoholic beverage of choice.

The celebration of Beer Day in Iceland has inspired a similar event in the U.S., known as Iceland Beer Day, or IBD.

See also

International Beer Day
Oktoberfest
Icelandic beer
Prohibition in Iceland
Pub crawl

References

External links
Icelandic Tourist Board official site 
Iceland Beer Day USA official site

Food and drink festivals in Iceland
Beer festivals in Europe
Beer in Iceland
March observances
Prohibition
Annual events in Iceland
Observances about food and drink
Spring (season) events in Iceland